"Ghetto Cowboy" is the lead single by American hip hop collective Mo Thugs taken from their second studio album Chapter II: Family Reunion, released in 1998 via Mo Thugs/Relativity Records. It features contributions from Layzie Bone, Krayzie Bone, Powder P, Thug Queen and Layzie Bone's wife Felecia. Produced by Krayzie Bone with co-production by Romeo Antonio, it contains replayed elements from Kenny Rogers' "The Gambler".

The single peaked at 15 on the Billboard Hot 100 while also reaching the top spot on the Hot Rap Singles chart. It was certified gold by the Recording Industry Association of America on December 17, 1998 for sales of 500,000 copies and also made it to No. 87 on the Billboard Year-End Hot 100 singles of 1999 as one of the most popular singles of the year.

Track listing
"Ghetto Cowboy" (Album Version)    
"Ghetto Cowboy" (Clean Album Version)    
"Ghetto Cowboy" (Video Version)    
"Ghetto Cowboy" (Instrumental)

Personnel
Anthony "Krayzie Bone" Henderson – vocals, producer, songwriter
Steven "Layzie Bone" Howse – vocals, songwriter
Kamilha "Thug Queen" Greer – vocals, songwriter
Felecia Lindsay – vocals, songwriter
Jimmy Lee Burke – vocals, songwriter
Jimmy Zavala – harmonica
Romeo Antonio – co-producer, assistant mixing engineer
Mark "V" Myers – recording
Howard Albert – mixing
Ron Albert – mixing
"Disco" Rick Taylor – assistant mixing engineer
Juan Rosario – assistant mixing engineer

Charts

Weekly charts

Year-end charts

Certifications

References

External links

1998 songs
1998 singles
Mo Thugs songs
Country rap songs
Bone Thugs-n-Harmony songs
Relativity Records singles
Songs written by Layzie Bone
Songs written by Krayzie Bone